Tan Zheng (June 14, 1906 – November 6, 1988) was a Chinese general, Communist revolutionary leader and strategist. He was a major leader of the Red Army and the People's Liberation Army.

Childhood

Tan Zheng was born in a little village called Nan Zhu (楠竹) in Xiangxiang, Hunan province. His original name was Tan Shimin. His grandfather was a well-known local member of the gentry. His father Tan Yun was a teacher at the primary school. Xiangxiang lies beside the Lian River, the earliest academy of classical learning was also built there. In 1912, when Tan Zheng was 6 years old, his family sent him to the private school located in the Seven Star Bridge with the hope of a new start from there. Tan's parents hoped him to build a career.

At school, Tan Zheng became friends with his future fellow revolutionary and brother-in-law Chen Geng. In the year of 1914, the Seven Star Bridge School was turned into a primary school. In this year, a classmate of Mao Zedong at Dong Shan School called Huang Duzhi became a teacher of the Seven Star Bridge Primary School. Tan Zheng was greatly influenced by this teacher. Mr. Huang told them about the Boxer Movement, the reform movement of 1898, the revolution of 1911, the October Revolution, so that Tan Zheng came to believe that only revolution could save the nation in peril. Tan determined to study in the Dong Shan School, when he was able to enroll though the recommendation of his friend Chen Geng. Tan studied in the Dong Shan School. In 1923, Tan began to read New Youth and other advanced/progressive books, and actively participate in the patriotic movement.

Personal life

His father arranged for Tan Zheng to study at Chen Geng's place? at the age of ten. There, Tan became deeply attached Chen Qiukui. At that time, Hunan custom was that when children were over ten years old, the adults would engage them to be married. Observing that Tan Zheng and Chen Qiukui were in love, their parents were naturally very happy.  Soon, the two families chose an auspicious day for the younger pair to marry. In 1924, Tan Zheng graduated from the Dong Shan School, and the marriage was held. At that time, Tan Zheng was 18 and Chen Qiukui was 15.  After their marriage, Tan Zheng often talked about his ideas and aspirations with his wife. With his wife's understanding and support, Tan Zheng decided to join the National Revolutionary Army Second Front Army. Half a year later, Chen Qiukui unexpectedly fell sick and died. Tan was inconsolable and had not been able to overcome the loss of his wife for 13 years.

Tan Zheng and Wang Changde, a fellow party member, were married.
Tan Zheng and his second wife Wang Changde, who was also a widow, had a happy lifelong marriage.

Early military career

Under the influence of his wife's  brother, General Chen Geng, Tan gave up civilian pursuits to join the army.

After the August 7th Meeting, the party initiated many armed uprisings. In September 1927, Mao Zedong and the Hunan Provincial Party Committee led the Autumn Harvest Uprising on the border of Hunan and Jiangxi. At that time, Tan Zheng was a lieutenant in the first group of workers and peasants revolutionary army.

Fight in the Jinggang Mountains

After the Autumn Harvest Uprising,  Tan went to the Jinggang Mountains with the other soldiers. He started standard military training. He worked as the secretary of Mao Zedong and helped Mao make copies of his book.

During Anti-Japanese War and second Kuomintang-Chinese communist civil war 

During the Anti-Japanese War, Tan served as director of the Political Department in the Eighth Route Army, and deputy director of the General Political Department. During the Chinese Civil War, Tan was the director of the Political Department in the Northeast Democratic Coalition. After the founding of the People's Republic of China, Tan Zheng served as the first deputy director of the PLA General Political Department. He was promoted to general in 1955 and was granted the People's Liberation Army Red Star of Merit Medal in 1988. Tan Zheng wrote “On the political work of the revolutionary army” and “On the enemy purpose and policy” during the Anti-Japanese War. He drafted the "Report on the army's political work" in 1944 by the CPC Central Committee. After modifications of Mao Zedong, Zhou Enlai, and the approval of the Central Committee, the work was promulgated in the Northwest Board meeting of senior cadres. The report is a comprehensive summary of the political work experience of the Red Army, the Eighth Route and New Fourth Army. It summaries the change of the situation and tasks of the Anti-Japanese War, also discusses the status, basic principles and the basic principles of the people's army's political work.

After the founding of the PRC 

After the founding of the PRC, Tan Zheng became the deputy director of the People's Liberation Army General Political Department, the director, deputy secretary of defense, and the member of the Standing Committee of the CPC Central Military commission. He used to go into the army and guided the political work. Tan was one of the leaders of the Chinese Army in the Korean War. He also took part in the organization of Land Reform. In November 1956, Tan attended The Eighth National People's Congress and was elected as Secretary of the 8th Central Committee of the Communist Party of China. During the Cultural Revolution, he was held in prison for nine years. After his release, he could no longer work due to illness. He was politically rehabilitated in 1979, and died in Beijing in 1988.

Ranks
Grand General of People's Liberation Army (Da Jiang,1955).

References

1906 births
1988 deaths
People's Liberation Army generals from Hunan
Politicians from Xiangtan
Chinese Communist Party politicians from Hunan
People's Republic of China politicians from Hunan
Deputy Ministers of National Defense of the People's Republic of China
Burials at Babaoshan Revolutionary Cemetery